λ Crucis, Latinized as Lambda Crucis, is a single, variable star in the southern constellation Crux, near the constellation border with Centaurus. It is visible to the naked eye as a faint, blue-white hued point of light with an apparent visual magnitude that fluctuates around 4.62. The star is located approximately 384 light-years distant from the Sun based on parallax, and is drifting further away with a radial velocity of +12 km/s. It is a proper motion member of the Lower Centaurus–Crux sub-group in the
Scorpius–Centaurus OB association,
the nearest such association of co-moving massive stars to the Sun.

λ Crucis is listed in the General Catalogue of Variable Stars as a possible β Cephei-type variable.  Its brightness varies with an amplitude of 0m.02 over a period of 0.3951 days.  However, it is currently thought more likely to be a different type of variable, possibly a λ Eridani variable or rotating ellipsoidal variable.

This object is a B-type main-sequence star with a stellar classification of B4 Vne, where the suffix notation indicates "nebulous" (broad) lines due to rapid rotation, along with emission lines from circumstellar material, making it a Be star. It is around 53 million years old and is spinning rapidly with a projected rotational velocity of 341 km/s. The star has five times the mass of the Sun and about 3.0 times the Sun's radius.

References

B-type main-sequence stars
Beta Cephei variables
Lower Centaurus Crux

Crux (constellation)
Crucis, Lambda
Durchmusterung objects
112078
063007
4897
Be stars